The Iraq national under-20 football team represents Iraq in international football competitions in AFC U-20 Asian Cup which Iraq holds 5 titles, as well as any other international football tournaments. The team is controlled by the governing body for football in Iraq, Iraq Football Association (IFA).

The team has qualified five times for the FIFA U-20 World Cup, reaching fourth place in 2013.

Iraq U-20 have been awarded the AFC National Team of the Year award once in 2013, being the only U-20 team to win this award.

Recent results and fixtures
The following is a list of match results in the last 12 months, as well as any future matches that have been scheduled. The 2020 AFC U-19 Championship was cancelled after the draw for the group stage was conducted.
Legend

2022

2023

Players

Current squad
The following 23 players were named in the final squad for the 2023 AFC U-20 Asian Cup.
''Caps and goals correct as of 18 March 2023, after the game against Uzbekistan

Recent call-ups
The following players have been called up recently

PRE Part of the preliminary squad
INJ Player injured
U23 Player moved up to the Olympic team
WD Player withdrew for non-injury related reasons
UNK Unknown when the player was last with the squad
|}

Coaching staff

{| class="toccolours"
!bgcolor=silver|Position
!bgcolor=silver|Name
!bgcolor=silver|Nationality
|- bgcolor=#eeeeee
|Manager:||Emad Mohammed||
|- 
|Assist. manager:||Haidar Abdul-Jabar||
|- 
|Assist. manager:||Ahmed Wali||
|- 
|Assist. manager:||Ehsan Torki||
|-
|Goalk. manager:||Maan Jameel||
|- 
|Fitnes. manager:||Waleed Juma||
|- 
|Managing Director:||Mohammed Nasser Shakroun||
|-
|Technical Supervisor:||Dawood Al-Azzawi||
|-
|Team Manager:||Qahtan Al-Maliki||
|-
|Media Coordinator:||Nadeem Kareem||
|-

Coaches

Competitive record

FIFA U-20 World Cup record

AFC U-20 Asian Cup Record

Arab Cup U-20 Record

WAFF U-18 Championship Record

Minor tournaments

Iraqi Premier League

Honours

Titles
 FIFA U-20 World Cup
Fourth place: 2013
 AFC U-20 Asian Cup
Winners: 1975, 1977, 1978, 1988, 2000
Runners-up: 2012
Third place: 1982

Awards
AFC National Team of the Year: 2013

See also
Iraq national football team
Iraq national under-23 football team
Iraq national under-17 football team

References

External links
Official website
Official Iraq national football team on FIFA.com

Under-20
Asian national under-20 association football teams